WAAC may refer to:

 WAAC (FM), a radio station (92.9 FM) licensed to Valdosta, Georgia, United States
 WAAC (Nigeria), an airline that succeeded West African Airways Corporation after its folding
 War Artists' Advisory Committee, a British governmental organisation who aimed to compile a visual history of Britain in the Second World War
 Washington-Alexandria Architecture Center, an extension branch of the College of Design and Architecture of Virginia Tech
 West African Airways Corporation
 Western Association for Art Conservation a nonprofit regional membership organization for conservation professionals based in the Western United States
 Win At All Costs - Motto of the West London Lacrosse Club
 Women's Army Auxiliary Corps (Britain), a branch of the British military in the First World War
 Women's Army Corps, once abbreviated WAAC, a branch of the U.S. military in the Second World War
 Women's Art Association of Canada, an organization founded in 1887 to promote and support women artists and craftswomen in Canada
 WFSX (AM), a defunct radio station (1240 AM) formerly licensed to Fort Myers, Florida, United States which held the call sign WAAC from 1942 to 1943
 WIBQ, a radio station (1230 AM) licensed to Terre Haute, Indiana, United States which held the call sign WAAC from 1963 to 1983